The Walls of Dubrovnik are a series of defensive stone walls surrounding the city of Dubrovnik in southern Croatia. Ramparts were built in the outlying areas of the city, including the mountain slopes as part of a set of statues from 1272. The existing city walls were constructed mainly during the 13th-17th centuries.

Refugees from destroyed towns such as Epidaurus fled to what would become the defensive settlement of Dubrovnik (also known later as Ragusa) which would become a haven of refuge with the construction of its town walls. The walls were reinforced by three circular and 14 quadrangular towers, five bastions (bulwarks), two angular fortifications and the large St. John's Fortress. Land walls were additionally reinforced by one larger bastion  and nine smaller semicircular ones, like the casemate Fort Bokar, the oldest preserved fort of that kind in Europe. The moat that ran around the outside section of the city walls, which were armed by more than 120 cannons, provided superb city defense capabilities.

In 1979, the old city of Dubrovnik, which includes a substantial portion of the old walls of Dubrovnik, joined the UNESCO list of World Heritage Sites.

Former city walls

The construction of the first limestone forts around the city began in the Early Middle Ages, towards the end of the 8th century. But, the "old chronicles" say that some sort of castle reliably existed on the Lave peninsula quite a long time prior to that.

The city first spread towards the uninhabited eastern part of the islet, which explains why the current name for the southeast part of the city, near St. John's Fortress, is called Pustijerna. The name "Pustijerna" comes from the Latin statement "post terra", which means "outside the town". In the 9th and 10th centuries, the defensive wall enclosed the eastern portion of the city. When the sea channel separating the city from mainland was filled with earth in the 11th century, the city merged with the settlement on land, and soon, a single wall was built around the area of the present-day city core.

During this same time period, Dubrovnik and the surrounding area were described as a part of the Croatian (Grwasiah) entity, in one of the works by the famous Arab geographer Muhammad al-Idrisi. In his book Nuzhat al-Mushataq fi ikhtiraq al-afaq (English: "Joy for those who wish to sail over the world") from 1154, he mentioned Dubrovnik as the southernmost city of "the country of Croatia and Dalmatia". The basic city plan dates from 1292, when the port was rebuilt following a fire.

Modern-day city walls

The city walls have been preserved to the present day, not only because of the knowledge of the skilled construction workers and the constant care provided by city dwellers that maintained and rebuilt the structures as needed, but also because of the brilliantly reputed diplomacy in Ragusa, which managed on many occasions to avoid dangerous measures taken by enemies against the Republic of Ragusa.

The present shape of the walls was defined in the 14th century after the city gained its full independence from Venetian suzerainty, but the peak of its construction lasted from the beginning of the 15th century until the latter half of the 16th century. Being constructed very solidly, the walls were generally unaffected by a strong earthquake occurring in 1667. The largest stimulus for continued development and emergency repairs and works of the Ragusan fortresses came as a result of the danger of unexpected attack by Turkish military forces, especially after they conquered Constantinople in 1453. The city was also under latent danger of attack by the Venetians. For centuries the people of Dubrovnik were able to preserve their city-republic by skillful maneuvering between East and West. A strategic treaty with Turkey protected Ragusa's liberty and maintained the opportunity for a major trading role between the Ottoman Empire and Europe.

The irregular parallelogram surrounding Dubrovnik consists of four strong fortresses at its most significant points. To the north is the strong circular Minčeta Tower, and to the east side of the city port is the Revelin Fortress. The western city entrance is protected by the strong and nicely-shaped Fort Bokar, and the strong, freestanding, St. Lawrence Fortress (also known as Lovrijenac), protects the western side of the city from possible land and sea assaults. The large and complex St. John Fortress is located on the southeast side of the city.

Land Walls 
The land walls stretch from Fort Bokar in the west to the detached Revelin Fortress in the east. On the landside, the wall is protected with an additional range of slanted supporting walls as defense against artillery fire, especially against possible Ottoman attacks.

Gates 

The town has four city gates: two that lead to the harbor and two (with drawbridges) that lead to the mainland. During the time period when the Austrian Empire controlled the city, two more gates were opened in the wall.

Communication with the outside world on the land side was maintained with the city through two main well-protected city gates, one placed on the western side of the city and the other placed on the eastern side. These entrances were constructed so that communications with the city could not be carried out directly; the messenger had to enter through multiple doors and walk down a winding passageway, which is evidence of the security measures taken as a last defense against the possibility of a surprise breach or entrance of unexpected visitors.

Gate of Pile

The Pile Gates are a well-fortified complex with multiple doors, defended by Fort Bokar and the moat that ran around the outside section of the city walls. At the entrance gate to the Old Town, on the western side of the land walls, there is a stone bridge between two Gothic arches, which were designed by the architect Paskoje Miličević in 1471. That bridge connects to another bridge, a wooden drawbridge which can be pulled up. During the republican era, the wooden drawbridge to the Pile Gate was hoisted each night with considerable pomp in a ceremony which delivered the city's keys to the Ragusan rector. Today, it spans a dry moat whose garden offers respite from crowds. Above the bridges, over the arch of town's principal gateway, there is a statue of city patron Saint Blaise, with a model of the Renaissance city. After passing the Pile Gate's original Gothic inner gateway, it is possible to reach one of a three access points to the city walls.

Gate of Ploče 

On the eastern side of the land walls stands the second major entrance to the city, the Gate of Ploče. This gate is protected by the freestanding Revelin Fortress, which are connected by a wooden drawbridge and a twin-spanned stone bridge spanning a protective ditch. The Outer Gate of Ploče was designed and constructed by architect Mihajlo Hranjac in 1628, while the two bridges to the Revelin Fortress were built in the 15th century by Paskoje Miličević. Miličević was also designed the Pile Gate bridges, which explains the similarities between the bridges. Over the bridge, just like with the Gate of Pile, there is the statue of Saint Blaise, the patron saint of Dubrovnik.

Gate of Buža
The Gate of Buža (meaning "hole") is located on the northern side of the land walls. This gate is relatively new compared to the other gates, as it was constructed during the early 1900s.

Sea Walls
The main wall on the sea-facing side of Dubrovnik stretches from Fort Bokar in the west to St. John Fortress in the south, and to the Revelin Fortress on the land-side. These walls are 1.5 to 5 meters (5–16 feet) thick, depending on their location and its strategic importance. The purpose of these walls were to help defend the city from sea-based attacks, particularly from the Republic of Venice, which was often considered a threat to Dubrovnik's safety.

City Harbour

One of the oldest sectors of Dubrovnik was constructed around a Late Antique castle by the sea, which stretched landwards a bit more than it does today. It was constructed on the site of the Pre-Romanesque cathedral and the Rector's Palace, thus encircling the city's harbour. The harbour was designed and constructed by engineer Paskoje Miličević in the late 15th century. Notably, the harbour was noticeably painted on the palm of St. Blaise in a triptych painted by the artist Nikola Božidarević around 1500.

The most prominent portion of the harbour is the three enormous arches (the fourth original arch was walled in) of a large arsenal built in the late 12th century and enlarged in the latter part 15th century. The harbour is also the oldest shipyard within the city and is still in use today.

Porporela was built in 1873, next to St. John Fortress. The Kase jetty (Kaše Breakwater) was built in 1485, according to the design of Paskoje Miličević, in order to defend the harbour and protect it from south-eastern winds and waves. The breakwater thus shortened the harbour's bulky chain stretched in the night from the St. John Fortress to St. Luke's tower. It was constructed of huge stone blocks laid over wooden foundations without binder.

Today, the arsenal hosts the City Café and a movie theatre, whereas both the harbour and Porporela have become pleasant promenades and tourist attractions.

Gates
In the city port area, one of the most significant areas of the maritime trade city, there were two entrances: the Gate of Ponte (port) and the Fishmarket Gate. The entire layout of the Dubrovnik streets, as well as a range of expansions, was intended for fast and effective communication with the forts of the city walls.

Gate of Ponte
Constructed in 1476, the Gate of Ponte is situated westwards from the Great Arsenal. The city wall, built at the same period, leads from the Gate to St. John Fortress. The present-day street of Damjan Juda was formed in the 15th century when the sewage system was completed, and building houses against the western city wall was no longer allowed.

The Fishmarket Gate
The Fishmarket Gate, built in 1381, stands eastward from the Great Arsenal. The three arches of the 15th century Small Arsenal, where small boats were repaired, are situated a bit further. The old tower of St. Luke's protects the harbour in the east, and the harbour entrance is encircled and guarded by the Revelin Fortress.

Forts

Forts within walls
The fall of Constantinople in 1453 to the Ottomans was a clear sign to the cautious citizens of Dubrovnik that ample defensive measures were quickly needed, the strengthening of its defensive structures the foremost of the issues. The fall of Bosnia, which followed soon in 1463, only hastened the works. As a result, the Republic invited the architect Michelozzo di Bartolomeo of Florence to direct the improvement of the city's defenses. His work in Dubrovnik resulted in the construction and expansion of numerous buildings of key importance for the defense of Dubrovnik.

Minčeta Tower

The Minčeta Tower was built by a local builder named Nicifor Ranjina and Italian engineers sent by Pope Pius II in 1463, at the height of the Turkish threat. Originally as a strong four-sided fort, it is the most prominent point in the defensive system towards the land. The tower's name derives from the name of the Menčetić family, who owned the ground upon which the tower was built. By its height and impressive volume, the tower dominates the northwestern high part of the city and its walls. In the middle of the 15th century, around the earlier quadrilateral fort, Michelozzo built a new round tower using new warfare technique and joined it to the new system of low scarp walls. The full six-meter (20 feet) thick walls of the new tower had a series of protected gun ports. The architect and sculptor Giorgio da Sebenico of Zadar continued the work on the Minčeta tower. He designed and built the high narrow round tower while the battlements are a later addition. The tower was completed in 1464 and became the symbol of the unconquerable city of Dubrovnik.

After a long excavation, a 16th-century cannon foundry was discovered under Minčeta Tower in Gornji ugao (Upper Tower). It is now a museum.

Fort Bokar

The Fort Bokar, often called "Zvjezdan", is considered to be amongst the most beautiful instances of harmonious and functional fortification architecture. Built as a two-story casemate fortress by Michelozzo from 1461 to 1463, while the city walls were being reconstructed, it stands in front of the medieval wall face protruding into space almost with its whole cylindrical volume. It was conceived as the key point in the defense of the Pila Gate, the western fortified entrance of the city; and after the Minčeta Tower, it is the second key point in the defense of the western land approach to the city.

St. John Fortress

The St. John Fortress, often called Mulo Tower, is a complex monumental building on the southeastern side of the old city port, controlling and protecting its entrance. The first fort was built in the mid 14th century, but it was modified on several occasions in the course of the 15th and 16th centuries, which can be seen in the triptych made by the painter Nikola Božidarević in the Dominican monastery. The painting shows Saint Blaise, the patron saint of Dubrovnik. Dominant in the port ambiance, the St. John Fortress prevented access of pirates and other enemy ships. Always cautious at the first sign of danger, the inhabitants of Dubrovnik used to close the entry into the port with heavy chains stretched between the St. John Fortress and the Kase jetty, and they also used to wall up all the port entries to the Great Arsenal.

Today, the fortress houses an aquarium on the ground floor, stocked with fish from various parts of the Adriatic Sea. On the upper floors there is an ethnographic and a maritime museum devoted to the Republic Maritime Period, the Age of Steam, the Second World War, and the section of techniques of sailing and navigation.

Detached forts

Revelin Fortress

In the period of unmistakable Turkish danger and the fall of Bosnia under Turkish rule, a detached fortress providing additional protection to the land approach to the eastern Ploče Gate was built to the east of the city in 1462. The name Revelin derives from rivelino (ravelin), a term in military architecture which refers to work built opposite the city gate in order to afford better protection from enemy attack. Danger of Venetian assault suddenly increased in the times of the First Holy League, and it was necessary to strengthen this vulnerable point of the city fortifications. The Senate hired Antonio Ferramolino, an experienced builder of fortresses in the service of the Spanish admiral Doria, a trusted friend of the Republic. In 1538 the Senate approved his drawings of the new, much stronger Revelin Fortress. It took 11 years to build it, and during that time all other construction work in the city had stopped in order to finish this fortress as soon as possible.

The new Revelin became the strongest of the city fortresses, safeguarding the eastern land approach to the city. Shaped in the form of an irregular quadrilateral with one of its sides descending towards the sea, it is protected by a deep ditch on the other. One bridge crosses the protective ditch and connects it to the Ploče Gate, while another bridge connects it to the eastern suburb. The construction work was executed so perfectly so that the devastating earthquake of 1667 did not damage Revelin. Divided into three large vaulted rooms in its interior, Revelin became the administrative center of the Republic.

St. Lawrence Fortress

The fortress has a quadrilateral court with mighty arches and, as its height is uneven, it has 3 terraces with powerful parapets with the broadest one looking south towards the sea. Lovrijenac was defended with 10 large cannons, the largest and most famous of which was called "Lizard". The walls exposed to enemy fire are almost 12 meters (39 feet) thick, but the large wall surface facing the city does not exceed 60 centimetres (2 feet). Two drawbridges lead to the fort, there being the inscription "Non Bene Pro Toto Libertas Venditur Auro" – "Freedom is not to be sold for all the treasures in the world." above the gate. To ensure loyalty, the troops in St. Lawrence Fortress were rotated every 30 days. And to ensure complete loyalty, they were given only 30 days of rations when they went into the fort. According to old scripts it was built in only three months.

Today its interior is one of the most dignified stages in Europe, and a well-known place for William Shakespeare's Hamlet performances.

Fortifications around Dubrovnik

Walls of Ston

Despite its small size, the well protected Republic of Ragusa decided to use Pelješac to build another line of defense. At Pelješac's narrowest point, just before joining the mainland, a wall from Ston to Mali Ston was built.

It was completed in the 15th century along with other 40 towers and 5 fortresses. The "wall" meant protection to the precious salt pans that greatly contributed to Dubrovnik's wealth, which are still being worked today.

Falcon Fortress

The Falcon Fortress was one of the largest and most important fortresses on the territory of the Republic of Ragusa, due to its position in the mountainous region near the Bosnian inland. It was built at the location of earlier Illyrian and later Roman fortifications, evident from the remains of ceramics and Roman bricks in its walls. In 1391, the Sanković brothers, at that time the rulers of Konavle, gave to the Republic of Rag full authority over the Falcon Fortress, while it came under republic's final possession only in 1423.

Due to its strategic importance, the Republic of Ragusa constantly invested in the maintenance of the fortress, which contained a cistern, a powder storage, wine and food cellars, sentry-boxes, military barracks, and sanctuary buildings to accommodate refugees from nearby villages in the event of war.

Imperial Fortress

The Fortress is placed at the top of the mountain Srđ, just above the city of Dubrovnik. It was built in 1806 by Marshal Marmont, called the Imperial, in honor of emperor Napoleon. The fortress was strategically important to defend the northern side of the city.

Prevlaka Fortress

This fortress is placed at Ponta Oštro, at the very end of Prevlaka peninsula. It was built in the mid-19th century, between 1856 and 1862, as part of the fortification system of the Bay of Kotor at the time of the Austrian Empire. By its monumentality and unique structure, it presents an exceptional example of military architecture of its time. Today, the fortress is out of use and badly damaged by various destructions during history.

City walls during sieges

Saracen siege in 866–867

In 866, a major Arab raid along Dalmatia struck Budva and Kotor, and then laid siege to Dubrovnik in 867. The city appealed to Byzantine Emperor Basil the Macedonian, who responded by sending over one hundred ships. Finally, the 866–867 Saracens' siege of Dubrovnik, which lasted fifteen months, was raised due to the intervention of Basil I, who sent a fleet under the command of Niketas Oryphas in relief of the city. After this successful intervention, the Byzantine navy sailed along the coast collecting promises of loyalty to the empire from the Dalmatian cities.

Venetian siege in 948

With the weakening of Byzantium, Venice began to see Ragusa as a rival who needed to be brought under her control, but the attempt to conquer the city in 948 failed. The citizens of the city attributed this to Saint Blaise, whom they adopted as the patron saint of the city.

Nemanja's siege in 1185

After some territorial disputes, war broke out between Stefan Nemanja, Grand prince of Raška, and the city of Dubrovnik, at that time under Norman suzerainty. In 1185, Nemanja attacked the city and laid siege to it, but a Ragusan counter-attack drove Nemanja's forces back. According to chronicles from Dubrovnik, which are accepted by most historians, the siege ultimately failed. How much help Dubrovnik received from the Normans while repelling the siege is also not known exactly.

Venetian and Fourth Crusades siege in 1205

In 1205, the Republic of Venice invaded Dalmatia with the forces of the Fourth Crusade. Ragusa was forced to pay a tribute, eventually becoming a source of supplies for Venice, thus saving itself from being sacked like Zadar in the Siege of Zara, used as Venice's naval base in the southern Adriatic Sea. In the 14th century, after liberation from Venetian supremacy, extensive work was done on the walls to ensure the republic's liberty.

Siege by Stjepan Vukčić Kosača in 1451

In 1451, the very powerful Bosnian regional lord Herzeg Stjepan Vukčić Kosača attacked Dubrovnik, and laid siege to the city. He had earlier been made a Ragusan nobleman and, consequently, the Ragusan government now proclaimed him a traitor. A reward of 15,000 ducats, a palace in Dubrovnik worth 2,000 ducats, and an annual income of 300 ducats was offered to anyone who would kill him, along with the promise of hereditary Ragusan nobility which also helped hold this promise to whoever did the deed. Stjepan was so scared by the threat that he finally raised the siege.

Russian siege in 1806

By 1800, the Republic had a highly organized network of consulates and consular offices in more than eighty cities and ports around the world. In 1806, the Republic surrendered to the forces of the First French Empire to end a months-long siege by the Russian and Montenegrin fleet during which 3,000 cannonballs fell on the city. The French lifted the siege and Ragusa was saved. The French army, led by Napoleon Bonaparte, entered Dubrovnik in 1806. In 1808, Marshal Auguste de Marmont abolished the Republic of Ragusa and amalgamated its territory into the French Illyrian Provinces, himself becoming the "Duke of Ragusa" (Duc de Raguse).

Anglo-Austrian siege in 1814

Austria declared war on France in August 1813 and by the Autumn the Royal Navy enjoyed unopposed domination over the Adriatic sea. Working in conjunction with the Austrian armies now invading the Illyrian Provinces and Northern Italy Rear Admiral Thomas Fremantle's ships were able to rapidly transport British and Austrian troops from one point to another, forcing the surrender of the strategic ports one after another December. Captain William Hoste with his ship HMS Bacchante (38 guns) along with HMS Saracen an 18 gun brig, arrived at Ragusa already blockaded by pro-Austrian Croat forces led by Todor Milutinović. The British with the Austrians were able to take the Imperial fortress and positions on Lokrum island. By hauling cannon up to Srđ hill they bombarded the city until the French General Joseph de Montrichard decided it was best to surrender. British and Croat troops entered the city via the Pile gates, while the Ragusan rebels were kept out.

Yugoslav army siege in 1991–1992

The Siege of Dubrovnik is a term marking the battle and siege of the city of Dubrovnik and the surrounding area in Croatia as part of the Croatian War of Independence. Dubrovnik was besieged and attacked by forces of the Serb-dominated Yugoslav People's Army (JNA) in late 1991, with the major fighting ending in early 1992, and the Croatian counterattack finally lifting the siege and liberating the area in mid-1992. At the International Criminal Tribunal for the former Yugoslavia (ICTY), the prosecution alleged that, "It was the objective of the Serb forces to detach this area from Croatia and to annex it to Montenegro."

In 1991, the American Institute of Architects condemned the bombardment of the city's buildings. The Institute for the Protection of Cultural Monuments, in conjunction with UNESCO, found that, of the 824 buildings in the Old Town, 563 (or 68.33 percent) had been hit by projectiles during the siege. Of these 563, nine buildings had been completely destroyed by one of several major fires that occurred during the siege. In 1993, the Institute for the Rehabilitation of Dubrovnik and UNESCO estimated the total cost for restoring public, private, and religious buildings, streets, squares, fountains, ramparts, gates, and bridges at $9,657,578. By the end of 1999, over $7,000,000 had been spent on restoration. It is a testament to the resilience of the ancient walls that more buildings in the old town were not destroyed during the bombardment; the ancient walls in fact were more effective at resisting modern weaponry than contemporary structures in the city's periphery.

See also

 Fort Lovrijenac
 List of walls
 List of cities with defensive walls
 List of castles in Croatia

Notes

References

Sources

 
 
 
 
 
 
 
 
 
 
 Zlatno doba Dubrovnika XV. i XVI. stoljeće, Muzejski prostor i Dubrovački muzej, Zagreb-Dubrovnik 1987.

External links

 Old City of Dubrovnik – UNESCO World Heritage Centre
 Video, Dubrovnik Digital reconstruction by GRAIL at Washington University
  Društvo prijatelja dubrovačke starine – Gradske zidine

Dubrovnik
Buildings and structures in Dubrovnik
Fortifications in Croatia
Tourist attractions in Dubrovnik